is a Japanese mecha anime television series produced by Sunrise. The series aired between January 5, 2014 and March 30, 2014. The first episode was pre-aired on December 29, 2013. A manga adaptation began serialization in ASCII Media Works' Dengeki Daioh from January 27, 2014. A 2-part sequel aired on September 29 and 30, 2014.

Plot 
Buddy Complex revolves around the main character, Aoba Watase, an ordinary high school boy. He lived an average, everyday life commuting to high school in the city. On the first day back after summer break, Aoba is attacked by a giant robot that appears out of the sky. As he's pursued through the city, his classmate Hina Yumihara appears in a giant robot of her own. She rescues him, and tells him cryptically that "Dio is waiting," before she sends Aoba into the future and then disappears. When Aoba wakes up, he finds himself over seventy years into the future, where the Free Pact Alliance and the Zogilia Republic are at war with each other, and there he meets a young pilot named Dio Junyou Weinberg. This begins Aoba's new life as a pilot of the Free Pact Alliance, and together with Dio, they would change the fate of the world.

Characters

Main characters

 Voiced by: Yoshitsugu Matsuoka
 Aoba is the main protagonist. At 16 years old, he is first year student at Seio High School. Aoba is a bright, considerate young man. He excels at athletics, especially basketball. He was an ordinary Japanese high school student from 2014 who got transported into the year 2088 and now fights for the Free Pact Alliance.  He is the pilot of the Coupling Valiancer Luxon, and later Luxon Next. He has exceptional compatibility as a Coupler. He was surprised to see Hina as the Zogilia pilot with no memories of him from the past and even tries to kill him when he offered his hand to her to come into Luxon's cockpit. Despite knowing that Hina was the enemy, Aoba doesn't want to fight her because she is the girl who saved his life. After another encounter with Hina and he talked with her, Aoba was almost convinced she was not the same Hina as the Hina Yumihara who saved him. But he doesn't seem to care about it anymore, when he invites Hina to join the Cygnus after her father's death, even though his effort to bring Hina to his side is ruined by Bizon. Later, he realizes she is indeed the same Hina who saved his life and he decides to save her from her fate.
 

 Voiced by: Kōki Uchiyama
 Dio is the 16 year old ace pilot of the Free Pact Alliance. He is the pilot of Coupling Valiancer Bradyon and later Bradyon Next. He's calm and stoic, but he has a strong sense of justice in his heart. He usually looks down on Aoba. After he saw the images of Aoba's memories during Coupling using the old Valiancers, he starts to believe Aoba and helps him to get through Hina and saves her.

/ 
 Voiced by: Saori Hayami
 Hina is the main heroine. She is a first year student at Seio High School. Hina Yumihara is Aoba's classmate who ends up next to him in class following seat changes after the break and seems to have feelings for him. She keeps acting cold, stiff, and formal toward Aoba that makes Aoba thinks he did something to her. She is actually a mecha pilot from the future who has a mission to protect Aoba from opposing mecha from the same future with her who wants to kill him. She sent Aoba into the future, where she had not yet met Aoba and served as a pilot of Zogilia Republic, enemy of the Free Pact Alliance. In Zogilia, Hina is the daughter of veteran Lieutenant Commander of Zogilian military, Viktor Ryazan. She was assigned to Alfried's squad as the pilot of the Fortuna but later transferred to Zogilia's Adminburo as the pilot of Coupling Valiancer Karura. During her first encounter with Aoba, she's confused an enemy pilot knew her name. She even tries to kill him when he offered his hand to her to come into Luxon's cockpit. She's intrigued by Aoba's kindness after he saved her when they were stranded together on deserted island even though they are each other's enemy soldier and he also gave her the pink cat hairpin that belongs to Hina Yumihara. But, it caused her childhood friend Bizon who is in love with her to scold her and despises Aoba.

Free Pact Alliance
The Free Pact Alliance, formally called , is a long-standing alliance between Japan and North American and Western European countries to counter the advance of the Zogilia Republic.

Crew of the Cygnus

Captain of the Cygnus. He often seems unreliable and doesn't stand out much, but he gives precise orders based on sharp judgment when it counts. 

Vice-captain of the Cygnus. She is an excellent battlefield commander, and Captain Kuramitsu places a lot of trust in her.

Captain of the Cygnus' valiancer unit. Pilot of Beryl Commander. He is friendly and caring and acts like an older brother to those aboard Cygnus.

Member of the Cygnus' valiancer unit. Pilot of Beryl Assault. Though often sarcastic, he sometimes shows great care for his comrades as well.

New member of the Cygnus' valiancer unit. Pilot of Beryl Explorer. He was Dio's classmate and Coupling buddy during Couplers Training at Lake Louise. He is also capable of Coupling with Aoba.

A scientist in charge of the Coupling System. Developed the specialized cockpit that is used in Luxon and Braydon. She was an apprentice of Alessandro Fermi and is an extremely skilled researcher. Her personality is bright and active. She seems to be in a relationship with Lee Conrad.

Cygnus's bridge crew member and Elvira Hill's aid but practical matters are left in her care. She's honest and straightforward, but a bit shy. She was one of the first people to interact with Aoba upon his arrival to the Cygnus. She seems to have feelings for Aoba and worries that if given the chance Aoba would leave them and return to his own time period.

Cygnus's bridge crew member. She is operator in charge of controlling Cygnus' valiancer unit. Unlike her friend Mayuka, she's full of energy.

Cygnus's bridge crew member and is responsible of the Cygnus's radar. He has neck-length bob hair.

Cygnus's bridge crew member and is responsible of the Cygnus's weapon systems. He wears eyeglasses.

Cygnus's bridge crew member and is responsible of the Cygnus's navigation. He has tan skin and curly hair.

Cygnus's bridge crew member. He is responsible of the Cygnus's engines management. He serves as head instructor for Aoba's new recruit training.

Chief mechanic on the Cygnus.

Mishima was introduced in Buddy Complex Kanketsu-hen as extra pilot of Cygnus's valiancer unit. He admired Aoba as a fellow Japanese and a Coupler. He was the pilot of one of the Alliance's valiancers that got wiped out by second Gorgon.

Others

Dio and Fiona's father.

Fiona is the younger sister of Dio. She is 12 years old. She was injured in a Zogilia attack that took the life of her mother prior to the events of the series. As a result she is confined to a wheelchair. She deeply cares about her brother's well-being and hopes that one day he and their father will reconcile.

Elvira's mentor. Team leader of Coupling system's development team.

Vice admiral and Pacific Fleet Acting Commander of Free Pact Alliance's military. He is skeptical about the Coupling System.

Rear Admiral and 1st Navy Special Squadron Commander of Free Pact Alliance's military. He believes Coupling System will become a force to overturn the war.

Zogilia Republic
Zogilia Republic, formally called  is a small nation that quickly grew into a superpower by conquering neighboring countries and expanding its territory along mainland Asia, Russia, Eastern Europe, and Scandinavia.

Alfried Gallant's squad

Captain of Trident and later Vajra. Pilot of Alsiel. He is a Commander assigned to 501st Mobile Company, 193 U-boat Brigade. He possesses great skill in strategic commands in addition to his clever Valiancer piloting skills. 
 / 

Member of Alfried's squad but later transferred to Zogilia's Adminburo together with Hina. Bizon is 20 years old. He is childhood friend of Hina. He is an honest soldier born to a prominent family. He's well trusted by Alfried and often given charge of the front lines. He is the pilot of Nebiros and later Coupling Valiancer Nergal. He is in love with Hina to a point that can be considered borderline obsession. He despises Aoba for trying to rescue Hina during a battle because it caused her to be put under suspicion of being a traitor but then later his hatred toward Aoba grows because of jealousy that Aoba intrigued Hina. An aged Bizon appears in the future, seeming to have survived Dio and Aoba's assault, looking far older, implying he stayed in the past and seems to be in a very influential position in Zogilia's army. He still holds a grudge against Aoba. 

Member of Alfried's squad. Pilot of Ogre. He's aggressive, headstrong, and reckless. His strength in combat is great, but his personality is his true fault.

Member of Alfried's squad. Pilot of Krishna. He's a gentle, tender hearted young man, but he faces his enemies bravely in battle. 

Special Officer, dispatched by Zogilia's Administration Bureau to supervise Alfried's squad. She often considers her reputation and status above all else. 

Lieutenant Commander assigned to 501st Mobile Company, 193 U-boat Brigade. He is in charge of command in Vajra Aeroship under Commander Alfried Gallant.

Others

A scientist who defected to Zogilia from Free Pact Alliance. He orders Alfried's squad to steal Alliance's Coupling Valiancer to get Elvira's specialized cockpit that is used for Coupling System. 

Hina's father. He found Hina in Zagreb ten years ago then took her in as a war orphan and raised her as his own daughter. He is a Lieutenant Commander of Zogilian military assigned to 101st Independent Reconnaissance Brigade. During the infiltration of the Alliance's Hawaiian base, Viktor was shot and managed to tell Hina about his adoption of her before he died.

1st Airborne Division Commander, Protection Division of Zogilia Adminburo. He is Captain of Gae Bulg.  He's first thwarted by Dio using Beryl Explorer and later killed by Aoba and Dio using Luxon and Bradyon.

Senior Admiral and National Defense Force Siberian Front Commander of Zogilia Military. He assigns Aeroship Vajra to Alfried's unit as a present for bringing down Chitose.

Vice Admiral and 3rd Alaskan Unit Siberian Front Commander of Zogilia Military. He accepts the draft strategy proposed by Margaret as part of Alfried's plan to fire the giant nectar gun Gala Puska.

2014 Characters

Tsubasa is Aoba's younger sister who lives with him and their single mother. She is a middle schooler.

Tomoyo is Aoba and Tsubasa's mother. 

Ryutaro is Aoba's best friend and classmate at Seio High School. He and Aoba were both on basketball club in middle school but he ended up getting injured and both of them quit. Aoba attends the same high school with him because it's close to the hospital where Ryutaro gets his physical therapy.

Junichi is Aoba's friend and classmate at Seio High School. He, Aoba, and Ryutaro play basketball together after school. Both Junichi and Ryutaro realize that Hina's been watching Aoba ever since the entrance ceremony and think she likes Aoba.

Development
Sunrise filed for a trademark on the use of the words "Buddy Complex" in a logo on October 1, 2013. Despite making the trademark for a host of media items, the company had yet to announce any plans for the project. This changed on December 1, 2013 when the company unveiled a website in an announcement that they were developing the "traditional robot action" series, Buddy Complex.

Media

Anime

The anime series is produced by Sunrise in collaboration with Bandai Visual, Bandai Channel, Lantis, Banpresto, and Bandai Namco Games under Bandai Namco Holdings. It is an original creation of Hajime Yatate and is directed by Yasuhiro Tanabe, with series composition by BC Project. The series features character designs and animation direction by Asako Inayoshi and Tomoshige Inayoshi and music by Tatsuya Katou. The first episode received an advanced pre-broadcast on Tokyo MX on December 29, 2013. Following episodes premiered on Tokyo MX on January 5, 2014 with later airings on YTV, TVA, BS11 and Bandai Channel. Funimation streamed the series on their video website, beginning on January 6, 2014. Daisuki streamed the episodes worldwide on their website as well as on their official YouTube Channel. The series aired 13 episodes which ended on March 30, 2014. Bandai Visual will begin releasing the series in Japan on Blu-ray volumes starting on March 26, 2014.

A 2-part sequel titled  aired on September 29 and 30, 2014. It features the insert song "Twin Bird" performed by True.

Manga
A manga adaptation began serialization in ASCII Media Works' Dengeki Daioh from January 27 to October 27, 2014. The first compiled volume was released in Japan on March 27, 2014. A separate manga based on the smartphone game also began serialization on January 27 in ASCII Media Works' Dengeki Maoh. The compiled volume was released in Japan on September 27, 2014

Video game
A free-to-play multi-player smartphone game titled  was released by Bandai Namco Games for iOS and Android devices in Japan on March 7, 2014 with theme song "Orbital Line" by Erica Masaki.

References

External links
 Official anime website 
 Official smartphone game website 
 

Anime with original screenplays
Free-to-play video games
Funimation
Mecha anime and manga
Sunrise (company)
Bandai Namco franchises
Bandai Visual
Tokyo MX original programming
Japanese time travel television series
2014 manga
Manga series
ASCII Media Works manga
Dengeki Daioh
Shōnen manga
Android (operating system) games
IOS games
2014 video games
2014 Japanese television series endings
Japan-exclusive video games
Video games about mecha
Video games developed in Japan